The Mysterious Warning, a German Tale is a novel by the English gothic novelist Eliza Parsons.  It was first published in 1796 and is one of the seven "horrid novels" lampooned in Jane Austen's Northanger Abbey.
Dear creature! How much I am obliged to you; and when you have finished Udolpho, we will read the Italian together; and I have made out a list of ten or twelve more of the same kind for you.

Have you, indeed! How glad I am! What are they all?

I will read you their names directly; here they are, in my pocketbook. Castle of Wolfenbach, Clermont, Mysterious Warnings, Necromancer of the Black Forest, Midnight Bell, Orphan of the Rhine, and Horrid Mysteries. Those will last us some time.

Yes, pretty well; but are they all horrid, are you sure they are all horrid?

—Northanger Abbey, ch. 6
Subtitled "a German Tale" it was first published in London by the sensationalist Minerva Press and contains many familiar gothic tropes, including dark family secrets, incest, seduction, and ghostly apparitions.

Editions

1824, London: S. Fisher
1835, London: Joseph Smith
1968, London: Folio Press
2007, Valancourt Books

Footnotes

18th-century British novels
1796 novels
Novels by Eliza Parsons
1790s fantasy novels
British Gothic novels
Incest in fiction